Adam May is a former television news anchor and reporter at WBAL-TV in Baltimore.  He was previously lead contributor to Al Jazeera America's flagship show, America Tonight. May was also previously an anchor and reporter at Baltimore’s CBS owned and operated station, WJZ-TV.

About

May attended the University of Minnesota. He started his career at KBJR in Duluth, MN before working at WHAS in Louisville, KY, and WAAY in Huntsville, AL.

In 2003, he joined WJZ-TV in Baltimore. Adam May's investigative stories have covered issues including the energy crisis, port security, witness intimidation and prison staffing shortages. In 2006, the National Academy of Television Arts and Sciences named May "Best Live Reporter" for the Mid-Atlantic region. After 10 years with the station he left to pursue national broadcast news at Al Jazeera America's news show, America Tonight as national correspondent and back up anchor. In 2016 after Al Jazeera America disbanded May briefly was a freelance correspondent for CBS Newspath in Washington, DC before returning to Baltimore this time at WBAL-TV as a weekend anchor and weekday evening reporter.

References

American television news anchors
American television reporters and correspondents
Al Jazeera people
CBS News people